is a train station in Ibara, Okayama Prefecture, Japan.

Lines
Ibara Railway
Ibara Line

Adjacent stations

|-
!colspan=5|Ibara Railway

Railway stations in Okayama Prefecture
Railway stations in Japan opened in 1999